The True Value Company is an American wholesaler with over 4,500 independent retail locations worldwide.

The True Value Company supports several different retail identities, including True Value (hardware and home center stores), Grand Rental Station, Party Central, and Taylor Rental (equipment and party rentals), Induserve Supply (commercial supplies), and Home & Garden Showplace (nursery and garden center stores), as well as affiliate stores that buy from the True Value Company but do not use any of the national store identities.

The wholesaler supports its retailers through 13 regional distribution centers and approximately 2,500 employees in 60 countries. The corporate headquarters are located in the O'Hare neighborhood of Chicago.

Historically it was a cooperative owned by retailers, but in 2018 it was purchased by ACON Investments.

History 
True Value Company was originally made of four hardware cooperatives and a hardware wholesaler: American Hardware & Supply (ServiStar), Coast to Coast Corporation, Cotter & Company (True Value), and the Midwest-based Hibbard Spencer Bartlett & Company.

Cotter & Company was established in 1948 by John Cotter with 12 original member stores. The cooperative grew in membership and in 1962 Cotter & Company purchased the assets of Hibbard Spencer Bartlett & Company (formerly led by Adolphus C. Bartlett) for $2.5 million, acquiring the True Value trademark for $2500 as part of the acquisition. ServiStar Hardware (formerly American Hardware Supply) had previously purchased Coast to Coast Hardware and had renamed itself to Servistar & Coast to Coast Hardware.  Their hardware stores were operating under either ServiStar or Coast to Coast retail identities. In 1997 they merged with Cotter & Company to form TruServ Corporation.

During a 1999 audit, accounting irregularities of about $100 million were discovered originating from pre-merger Cotter & Company, leading to a $131 million loss that year causing the value of TruServ stock to plummet. During this tumultuous period (1999–2001), a number of hardware stores chose to leave TruServ to join competing hardware cooperatives (Ace Hardware, Do It Best). TruServ Corporation brought in new management, eliminated the ServiStar and Coast to Coast brand names, and streamlined operations by closing many of the regional distribution centers.  In 2006 TruServ Corporation was renamed True Value Company.

In 2018 an international private equity investment firm, ACON, purchased True Value.

In 2019 True Value announced the opening of a new 1.4 million square foot facility servicing over 1,000 stores located in Hanover Township, Pennsylvania. It was set to open in the fall of 2019 to accommodate the new businesses it was serving after being purchased by ACON in 2018. Along with the new distribution center True Value also adopted the "hub-and-spoke" model.

On November 1, 2022, True Value acquired the Agway Trademark from Agway Farm & Home Supply.

General Paint & Manufacturing 
True Value owns its paint manufacturing plant known as General Paint & Manufacturing (GPM) and also manufactures paint for a variety of other companies. GPM was established in 1922. The factory in Cary, Illinois, became operational in April 1976. The facility manufactures latex paints, oil based paints, stains and aerosols exceeding 7,300,000 gallons annually. GPM also manufactures a complete line of jansan/cleaning chemicals.

Home & Garden Showplace 
Home & Garden Showplace is the garden center store identity of the True Value Company. It was started by ServiStar to help build their lawn and garden sales. Today there are over 260 Home & Garden Showplace stores across the United States. Each store is independently owned and purchases merchandise through the True Value distribution centers and buys from many growers of plants through various True Value buying programs.

Other affiliates
Grand Rental Station, Taylor Rental, Party Central, and True Value Rental are the rental store identities of the True Value Company.  Grand Rental Station, Taylor Rental, and Party Central are all standalone, independently owned franchises. In addition to True Value stores there are over 400 affiliate stores across the United States. These stores purchase merchandise both through the True Value distribution centers and directly from certain manufacturers. True Value Rental is the in-store rental program found in many True Value Hardware stores across the country.

Induserve Supply  
Induserve Supply is the MRO store identity of the True Value Company. Induserve Supply is a network of independent commercial, industrial and MRO (Maintenance, Repair & Operations) suppliers, as well as many True Value retailers, providing products for small businesses, major institutions, universities, and government offices.

House brands  
True Value's Green Thumb, Master Electrician, Master Plumber, Lawn Chief and Master Mechanic brands are made by many different manufacturers worldwide. They are manufactured to company specifications and are sold exclusively by True Value member stores, including True Value, Home & Garden Showplace, and other affiliates.

TruServ Canada
The roots of the Canadian affiliate TruServ Canada go back to the Stedman's chain founded in 1907 in Ontario, and the Macleod's chain of Western Canada founded in 1917.  The companies merged in 1964 to form Macleod-Stedman Inc., and in 1992 Macleod-Stedman became Cotter Canada. Cotter's Canadian and US divisions changed their names to TrueServ in 1997.  Since 2001, the American chain no longer owns any stake in TruServ Canada.

Notes 

Hardware stores of the United States
Home improvement retailers of the United States
Retailers' cooperatives in the United States
American companies established in 1948
Retail companies established in 1948
Companies based in Chicago
1948 establishments in Illinois